SMS V48 was a 1913 Type Large Torpedo Boat (Großes Torpedoboot) of the Imperial German Navy during World War I, and the 24th ship of her class.

Construction

Built by AG Vulcan Stettin shipyard, Germany, V48 was ordered on 22 April 1914, as part of the 1914 shipbuilding programme. She was launched on 6 August 1915 and commissioned on 10 December 1915. The "V" in V48 denotes the shipyard at which she was built.

Armament originally consisted of three 8.8 cm SK L/45 naval guns in single mounts, together with six 50 cm (19.7 in) torpedo tubes with two fixed single tubes forward and 2 twin mounts aft. Up to 24 mines could be carried. In 1916 the 8.8 cm guns were replaced by three 10.5 cm SK L/45 naval guns. The ship had a complement of 87 officers and men.

Service

V48 was assigned to the 3rd Flotilla, 6th Half-Flotilla when she participated in the Battle of Jutland. In this action, the 3rd Flotilla launched an unsuccessful torpedo attack against British battlecruisers, and after turning away the German destroyers exchanged fire with the damaged destroyer , with V48 receiving damage from the impact of one or two  shells, which disabled the German destroyer's machinery, forcing V48 to stop. An attempt by the German destroyer  to take V48 in tow was abandoned because of heavy fire from the British battleline. The battleship  later fired a  shell into her. She was eventually sunk by a 4-inch shell fired from an unidentified ship of the British 12th Destroyer Flotilla, and lost with 90 men killed in action.

The sole survivor was Hans Robert Tietje who spent 14 hours in the water before being picked up by a Danish fishing boat.

References

External links
 Technical specs of the Großes Torpedoboot 1913 class
 A New York Times article describing the aftermath of the Battle of Jutland in which V48 is mentioned.

Torpedo boats of the Imperial German Navy
Maritime incidents in 1916
Ships sunk at the Battle of Jutland
1915 ships
Ships built in Stettin
World War I torpedo boats of Germany